Glendora Folsom is a cable TV producer from New York. Her birth name was Glendora Vesta Folsom.  She is the host of A Chat with Glendora, which has cablecast over 13678 shows since 1972 on the Public-access television channels of cable systems all over the United States.

Biography

Early life
Glendora Vesta Folsom attended Classical High School in Springfield, MA, and later American International College. She completed a Bachelor of Arts degree in Psychology and English.

After graduation
After graduation, Glendora was a research assistant at the University of California, Berkeley in the psychology department. In 1951, she worked at NBC in Hollywood, as a script girl.

Children's show host
She returned to Massachusetts c. 1953, and began her television career, as a children's show host.  Her first show was "Glendora and her Picture Party" on channel 19 in Pittsfield, Massachusetts. It was sponsored and ran for 15 minutes per week. She was then hired at WMUR-TV in Manchester NH, where she began her program, the SS Glendora. She was the skipper of the mythical Fun and Games ship, the SS Glendora.

Boston
By 1955, she had brought her SS Glendora to WBZ-TV, the Westinghouse station in Boston. She was there for 6 years, Monday through Friday, The first show was 15 minutes and the second show was 45 minutes a day. Five days a week she was the captain of "Satellite Six," a 1950s-style sci-fi spaceship set, where she also aired cartoons.

Cable TV public access
In 1972, after being away from television for a decade, Glendora entered cable TV public access with "A Chat with Glendora." This aired on Lackawanna Cable TV in Buffalo. This was followed by Maine Cable Television, Bangor. Then came Valley Cablevison Ansonia, Seymour, Derby, CT and Shelton. The last one was Colonial Cablevison near Glens Falls, NY.

These cable companies hired Glendora as their public access TV packager. She owned the video equipment, did the videotaping and then returned to the "head-end," ran a coaxial cable from her video equipment to the public access TV module, and cable-cast on to the cable TV viewer.

The show focused on ordinary people from the local community.

Glendora remained on cable and public access television throughout the 1980s and 1990s.  In 1987, she appeared as a guest on Late Night with David Letterman. By the 1990s, she was living in White Plains NY, according to the New York Times, which noted that she was the host of a weekly talk show on local public access there ("L.I. Cable" 44).

In 1994, she sued and won when a Long Island NY cable system removed her program in a way she felt violated Federal, State and municipal law that no cable operator can exercise editorial control over Public Access TV. The court ruled "plaintiff has a statutory right to be on TV and must be returned to TV" ("L.I. Cable" 44).

Glendora lived in Kinderhook, NY from 2004 until 2012 and continued her work with her program. She currently lives in Nassau, NY, where she continues to produce episodes of "A Chat With Glendora".

On October 13, 2018 Glendora was inducted into the Hall of Fame American International College Springfield Massachusetts.

References

Further reading
 "Aboard Milton Bradley Liner."  Springfield (MA) Union, September 9, 1955, p. 29.
 "Long Island Cable Ordered To Restore A Public Access Program."  New York Times, August 14, 1994, p. L44.
 Smith, Betty.  "The Little People Rate Big In TV Chat With Glendora."  Bridgeport (CT) Post, February 17, 1974, p. D1.
 Tavel, Emilie.  "Children Jam TV Ship For Fun And Learning."  Christian Science Monitor, December 14, 1955, p. 6.

External links 
 
Late Night with David Letterman Episode 0914

Date of birth missing (living people)
Living people
American television personalities
Year of birth missing (living people)